Arenal-Monteverde Protected Zone, is a protected area in Costa Rica, managed under the Arenal Tempisque Conservation Area, it was created in 1977 by decree 6778-A.

References 

Nature reserves in Costa Rica
Protected areas established in 1977